Daisy, Daisies or DAISY may refer to:

Plants
 Bellis perennis, the common daisy, lawn daisy or English daisy, a European species

Other plants known as daisy
 Asteraceae, daisy family
 Euryops chrysanthemoides, African bush daisy
 Osteospermum, African daisy
 Tetraneuris acaulis, angelita daisy
 Melampodium leucanthum, blackfoot daisy
 Glebionis coronaria, crown daisy
 Brachyglottis greyi, daisy bush
 Olearia, daisy bush
 Argyranthemum, dill daisy, marguerite daisy
 Rhodanthemum hosmariense, Moroccan daisy
 Leucanthemum vulgare, oxeye daisy, dog daisy
 Leucanthemum × superbum, Shasta daisy
 Brachyscome, several species
 Gerbera jamesonii, Barberton daisy, Transvaal daisy
 Ismelia carinata, tricolor daisy
 Scabiosa prolifera, Carmel daisy
 Globularia, globe daisies
 Cleretum bellidiforme, Livingstone daisy

Arts, entertainment and media

Film and television
 Daisy (advertisement), a 1964 controversial political TV advertisement 
 Daisy (1923 film), a German silent romantic drama film
 Daisy (1988 film), a Malayalam musical love story
 Daisy (2006 film), a Korean urban romantic melodrama
 "Daisy" (How I Met Your Mother), an episode of the TV series
 Daisies (film), a 1966 Czech film

Fictional characters

Music
 Daisy (Big Scary album), 2021
 Daisy (Brand New album), 2009, and a song from the album
 Daisy (Dog's Eye View album), 1997
 "Daisy" (Ashnikko song), a song by Ashnikko from the 2021 mixtape Demidevil
 "Daisy" (Bonnie Pink song), 1999
 "Daisy" a song by Halfway to Hazard from the 2007 album Halfway to Hazard
 "Daisy" (Pentagon song), a song by Pentagon from the 2020 EP WE:TH
 "Daisies" (song), a song by Katy Perry from the 2020 album Smile
 "Daisy", a song by Fang Island from the 2010 album Fang Island
 "Daisy", a song by Switchfoot from the 2005 album Nothing Is Sound
 "Daisy", a song by Brotherhood of Man from the 1977 album Oh Boy!
 "Daisy", a song by Stone Temple Pilots from the 1996 album Tiny Music
 "Daisy", a song by Hafdís Huld from the 2009 album Synchronised Swimmers
 "Daisy",  a song by Zedd from the 2015 album True Colors
 "Daisy", a song by Pond from the 2019 album Tasmania
 "Daisy Bell", an 1892 song with chorus "Daisy, Daisy, give me your answer, do...."

Businesses and organizations
 Daisy (Girl Scouts), a membership level
 Daisy Outdoor Products, known primarily as Daisy, an American air gun manufacturer
 Daisy Systems (disambiguation), several companies
 The Daisy, a Rodeo Drive nightclub in Beverly Hills, California, U.S.
 Democracy is Freedom – The Daisy, known as The Daisy, an Italian political party
 Fort Wayne Daisies, an American women's professional baseball team 1945–1954
 Daisy, a brand of sour cream

Computing
 Daisy wheel printing, an impact printing technology
 Daisy (software), a content management system
 Digital Accessible Information System (DAISY), a technical standard for digital audiobooks
 List of DAISY software
 Digital Automated Identification System (DAISY), an automated species identification system

People
 Daisy (given name), including a list of people and fictional characters with the name
 Daisy (nickname), including a list of people with the nickname

Places

Australia
 Daisy Hill, Queensland
 Daisy Hill, Victoria

Canada
 Daisy Lake (disambiguation), several Canadian lakes

United States
 Daisy, Arkansas
 Daisy, Georgia
 Daisy, Kentucky
 Daisy, Maryland
 Daisy, Missouri
 Daisy, Oklahoma
 Daisy, Virginia
 Daisy, West Virginia
 Daisy Geyser, Yellowstone National Park
 Daisy Swamp, South Carolina
 Lake Daisy, Florida

Other uses
 Daisy (cocktail), a traditional long drink
 Daisy (doll), a 1970s doll designed by Mary Quant
 Daisy (steamboat), a steamboat that ran on Puget Sound, Washington, U.S., 1880–1897
 Operation Daisy, a 1981 military operation in Angola
 Tropical Storm Daisy, tropical cyclones named Daisy
 Daisy (perfume), a fragrance brand by Marc Jacobs
 Namaqualand Daisies, South Africa field hockey club

See also

 DayZ (disambiguation)
 Princess Daisy (disambiguation)
 Daisy chain (disambiguation)
 Daisy Hill (disambiguation)
 Daisy Dukes, short, tight denim shorts, named after The Dukes of Hazzard character Daisy Duke
 Daizy, a fictional character in Wow! Wow! Wubbzy!